Crossair Europe (European Continental Airways) was an airline headquartered on the grounds of EuroAirport Basel-Mulhouse-Freiburg in Saint-Louis, Haut Rhin, France, near Basel, Switzerland. It operated scheduled services to destinations in Italy and France. Its main base was EuroAirport Basel-Mulhouse-Freiburg.

History
Crossair Europe was a subsidiary of Swiss International Air Lines operating two Saab 2000s (decade) on their behalf. In March 2005 it was announced that Crossair Europe would be closed by  the end of the month. Their routes were taken over by Swiss.

Fleet
The Crossair Europe fleet consisted of 2 Saab 2000 aircraft (at January 2005). It had formerly operated three Saab 340Bs.

References

Defunct airlines of Switzerland
Airlines established in 1997
Airlines disestablished in 2005
Swiss companies disestablished in 2005
Swiss companies established in 1997